Belostoksky Uyezd (Белостокский уезд) was one of the subdivisions of the Grodno Governorate of the Russian Empire. It was situated in the northwestern part of the governorate. Its administrative centre was Białystok.

Demographics
At the time of the Russian Empire Census of 1897, Belostoksky Uyezd had a population of 206,615. Of these, 34.0% spoke Polish, 28.3% Yiddish, 26.1% Belarusian, 6.7% Russian, 3.6% German, 0.3% Ukrainian, 0.3% Chuvash, 0.3% Tatar, 0.2% Bashkir and 0.1% Lithuanian as their native language.

References

 
Uezds of Grodno Governorate
Grodno Governorate